Secretary is a 1976 Indian Telugu-language drama film directed by K. S. Prakash Rao. Starring Akkineni Nageswara Rao, Vanisri, the music was composed by K. V. Mahadevan. It was produced by D. Ramanaidu under Suresh Productions banner. The film was based on Yaddanapudi Sulochana Rani's novel of the same name and was also the last proper film for late Krishna Kumari, even in Telugu.

Plot
The film begins with Jayanthi (Vanisri) joining as a secretary in Vanitha Vihar the society of high class ladies such as Sumitra Devi (Suryakantham), Rekha Rani (Kanchana), Mrs.Karunakaram (Girija), etc. There, Jayanthi gets an acquaintance with an industrialist Raja Shekaram (Akkineni Nageswara Rao) and he starts liking her as she resembles his past love Geeta who, unfortunately, died. This irks the remaining ladies as they are indulgent towards his smartness & wealth. As a result, Jayanthi loses her job, so, Raja Shekaram appoints her as his secretary. But always, quarrels & disputes arise between them as Jayanthi dislikes Raja Shekaram's closeness with other ladies. Later on, Raja Shekaram realizes Jayanthi as his maternal uncle's daughter through their grandmother (Santha Kumari) and they decide to marry. Knowing it, all the tycoons begrudge especially Mr & Mrs.Karunakaram (Satyanarayana & Girija) as they have an intention to couple up their daughter Prameela (Jaya Sudha) with Raja Shekaram. So, they ploy & splits Jayanthi, showing menace to Raja Shekaram. Parallelly, Jayanthi's grandmother also passes away when grievous Jayanthi leaves the town. Now Mr. Moneybags create notoriety as if she eloped. At present, Jayanthi takes shelter at Dr. Vijayalakshmi (Krishna Kumari) as a caretaker to her infant children (Master Ramu & Baby Rohini). Here, Doctor's younger brother Prasad (Ranganath) aspires to marry Jayanthi which she too accepts. Meanwhile, Prameela elopes with Raja Shekaram's close friend Sivaram (Chandra Mohan) when these big shots mortify and pleads pardon from Raja Shekaram. Surprisingly, to the wheel of fortune, Prasad happens to be Raja Shekaram's friend. Right now, Raja Shekaram learns about regarding espousal of Prasad & Jayanth, so, he calmly leaves the place. At last, Prasad & Vijayalakshmi realize the truth and sends Jayanthi back. Finally, the movie ends on a happy note with the marriage of Raja Shekaram & Jayanthi.

Cast

Akkineni Nageswara Rao as Raja Shekharam
Vanisri as Jayanti 
Chandra Mohan as Sivaram
Gummadi as Dr. Subrahmanyam
Satyanarayana as Karunakaram
Allu Ramalingaiah as Rekha's husband
Raja Babu as Vasu
Ranganath as Dr. Prasad
Dhulipala as Varma
T. Subbarami Reddy as SP Sivaram Reddy (cameo)
D. Ramanaidu as Doctor (cameo)
Jayasudha as Prameela
Kanchana as Rekha Rani
Krishna Kumari as Dr.Vijayalakshmi
Suryakantham as Sumitra Devi
Hemalatha as Kameswaramma
Santha Kumari as Bamma
Girija as Karunakaram's wife
Rama Prabha as Vasanthi
Annapoorna as Sunanda
Radha Kumari 
Mamatha 
Kalpana Rai as servant maid
Y. Vijaya
Master Ramu 
Baby Rohini

Crew
Art: G. V. Subba Rao
Choreography: Saleem
Fights: Madhavan
Story: Yaddanapudi Sulochana Rani
Dialogues and Lyrics: Acharya Aatreya
Playback: S. P. Balasubrahmanyam, P. Susheela, V. Ramakrishna
Music: K. V. Mahadevan
Editing: K. A. Marthand
Cinematography: Vincent
Producer: D. Ramanaidu
Director: K. S. Prakash Rao
Banner: Suresh Productions
Release Date: 28 April 1976

Music 

Music was composed by K. V. Mahadevan. Lyrics were written by Acharya Aatreya. Music released on AVM Audio Company.

References

External links

1976 films
1970s Telugu-language films
Indian drama films
Films about women in India
Indian feminist films
Films scored by K. V. Mahadevan
Films based on Indian novels
Films directed by K. S. Prakash Rao
Films based on novels by Yaddanapudi Sulochana Rani
1970s feminist films
1976 drama films
Suresh Productions films